Anssi Löfman (born 29 June 1987) is a Finnish ice hockey player who currently plays professionally in Finland for SaiPa of the Liiga.

References

External links

Living people
SaiPa players
1987 births
Finnish ice hockey centres
JYP Jyväskylä players
People from Lappeenranta
Sportspeople from South Karelia